KCVM (93.5 FM) is a commercial radio station located in Evansdale, Iowa serving the Waterloo/Cedar Falls, Iowa area.  The station broadcasts a hot adult contemporary music format.  KCVM is licensed to James Coloff's Coloff Media, LLC.

The transmitter and broadcast tower are located northeast of Hudson.

History
KCVM was originally broadcast on 96.1 MHz from its inception in the 1990s until July 2010.  However, due to the need to protect several other stations in nearby markets from interference, the station had broadcast at an effective radiated power of 6 kilowatts with an extremely directional antenna pattern to avoid co-channel interference to stations such as KNWM in Madrid (Des Moines), KQPR in Albert Lea, Minnesota, and KMXG in Clinton (Quad Cities).  KCVM was also required to protect KCHA-FM (95.9 MHz) in Charles City from adjacent-channel interference.

On June 4, 2010, it was announced that KCVM would be moving from 96.1 to 93.5 and by July 22, KCVM had made the switch to 93.5 MHz; a frequency which allows the station to better serve the Cedar Valley since there are fewer stations on and near the 93.5 frequency that require protection from interference.

Signal upgrade application
KCVM currently has an application on file with the FCC to upgrade its signal again.  This time, the plan is to change the city of license from Hudson to Evansdale, and to upgrade from a Class A license to a Class C3 license, with a boost in power from its current 6 kilowatts up to 24.5 kilowatts, at an antenna height of 81.8 meters.  Also, the proposed antenna pattern is non-directional.  The new transmitter would be located east of Waterloo and north of Evansdale, on East Big Rock Road between Crane Creek Road and North Raymond Road (County Highway V49) in Black Hawk County.  The proposed upgrade would add outlying Cedar Valley communities such as Waverly, Oelwein, and Independence to KCVM's 60 dBu protected/city grade coverage coutour for the first time ever, as those communities have always received anywhere from marginal to poor reception from KCVM, especially on the previous 96.1 frequency (Oelwein and Independence would often receive KMXG in addition to KCVM back when KCVM was on 96.1; especially during times of tropospheric propagation).

HD Radio
On November 23, 2018, KCVM launched a Christmas music format on its HD2 subchannel, relayed on translator K293CH 106.5 FM Waterloo.

In mid-January 2019, KCVM-HD2 launched a country music format, branded as "Corn Country".

Previous logo

References

External links
KCVM official website

CVM
Hot adult contemporary radio stations in the United States
Radio stations established in 1998
1998 establishments in Iowa